The men's 200 metres event at the 1998 Commonwealth Games was held 18–19 September on National Stadium, Bukit Jalil.

Medalists

Results

Heats
Qualification: First 3 of each heat (Q) and the next 8 fastest qualified for the quarterfinals.

Wind:Heat 1: +0.3 m/s, Heat 2: +0.1 m/s, Heat 7: +0.3 m/s

Quarterfinals
Qualification: First 4 of each heat qualified directly (Q) for the semifinals.

Wind:Heat 1: 0.0 m/s, Heat 2: -0.1 m/s, Heat 4: +0.1 m/s

Semifinals
Qualification: First 4 of each heat qualified directly (Q) for the final.

Wind:Heat 1: -0.5 m/s, Heat 2: -0.7 m/s

Final
Wind: -0.2 m/s

References

200
1998